Tata BlueScope Steel (TBSPL)  is a joint venture between Tata Steel Limited and BlueScope Steel. It was established in 2005 with its headquartered in Pune.

History
Tata BlueScope Steel venture was established in 2005 with three major businesses: Coated Steel, Roof & Wall Cladding Products and Pre-engineered Building Solutions. Tata BlueScope Steel is headquartered in Pune and has its manufacturing units in Jamshedpur, Sriperumbudur, Bhiwadi and Pune. Tata BlueScope Steel has an annual metallic coating capacity of 250,000 tons and colour coating capacity of 150,000 tons.

Resources

2005 establishments in Maharashtra
Steel companies of India
Indian companies established in 2005
Manufacturing companies based in Pune
Manufacturing companies established in 2005